Hamzah Titofani Rivaldi (born 10 August 2002) is an Indonesian professional footballer who plays as a winger for Liga 1 club Arema.

Club career

Arema
He was signed for Arema to play in Liga 1 in the 2021 season. Tito made his first-team debut on 5 September 2021 as a substitute in a match against PSM Makassar at the Pakansari Stadium, Cibinong.

Career statistics

Club

Notes

Honours

Club 
Arema
Indonesia President's Cup: 2022

References

External links
 Hamzah Titofani at Soccerway
 Hamzah Titofani at Liga Indonesia

2002 births
Living people
Sportspeople from Malang
Sportspeople from East Java
Liga 1 (Indonesia) players
Indonesian footballers
Arema F.C. players
Association football midfielders